Tongchai Teptani (born 11 June 1936) is a Thai boxer. He competed in the men's welterweight event at the 1960 Summer Olympics. At the 1960 Summer Olympics in Rome, he lost to Andrés Navarro of Spain in the Round of 32 after receiving a bye in the Round of 64.

References

External links
 

1936 births
Living people
Tongchai Teptani
Tongchai Teptani
Boxers at the 1960 Summer Olympics
Tongchai Teptani
Asian Games medalists in boxing
Boxers at the 1958 Asian Games
Tongchai Teptani
Medalists at the 1958 Asian Games
Welterweight boxers
Tongchai Teptani